Natio may refer to:

 Nation, as its original Latin term
 Nation (university), a student organisation in ancient and medieval universities
 Natio Hungarica, term for the people of Hungary irrespective of their ethnic background

See also
 Nation (disambiguation)